Joseph Toppo (1943 − March 22, 2016) was an Indian politician. He was a Member of Parliament, represented Tezpur (Lok Sabha constituency) of Assam and was a member of Asom Gana Parishad.

References

1943 births
2016 deaths
Asom Gana Parishad politicians
India MPs 2009–2014
Lok Sabha members from Assam
People from Sonitpur district